Njegoš Petrović (born 18 July 1999) is a Serbian professional footballer who plays for Spanish side Granada.

Club career

Rad
Born in Krupanj, he started playing football with local club Rađevac and later moved to FK Rad, where he passed youth categories and signed a scholarship contract with club in 2014. Petrović was licensed with senior squad for the 2015–16 season, but he officially joined the first team in summer 2016, when he signed a four-year professional contract with Rad. Previously, he made his Serbian SuperLiga debut in fourth fixture match of the 2016–17 season on 10 August 2016 against Radnik Surdulica. After seven league matches which he started from the bench and the whole cup match against Dinamo Vranje, Petrović started his first league match on the field and played the whole game against Borac Čačak in 13th fixture of the 2016–17 season.

Red Star Belgrade
In August 2019, Petrović signed a four-year contract with Red Star Belgrade in a €400,000 transfer from Rad. Red Star's sports director Mitar Mrkela commented that "Petrović is the best player in [his] position in Serbia". He made his debut for Red Star on 9 August 2019 in a 2–0 win against Mladost Lučani under coach Vladan Milojević.

Granada
In January 2022, Petrović signed a four-and-a-half-years contract with Granada in a €1,500,000 transfer from Red Star.

International career
Petrović was a member of Serbia U16 and Serbia U17 squads between 2014 and 2016. In August 2016, Petrović was called into Serbia U19 squad for memorial tournament "Stevan Vilotić - Ćele", where he debuted in opening match against United States. Petrović suffered an anterior cruciate ligament injury during the match against Sweden, played on 14 November 2016.

Personal life 
On 22 June 2020 he tested positive for COVID-19.

Career statistics

Club

Honours
Red Star Belgrade
 Serbian SuperLiga (2): 2019–20, 2020–21
 Serbian Cup: 2020–21

References

External links
 
 
 

1999 births
Living people
People from Krupanj
Serbian footballers
Association football midfielders
Serbia youth international footballers
Serbia under-21 international footballers
Serbian SuperLiga players
La Liga players
Segunda División players
FK Rad players
Red Star Belgrade footballers
Granada CF footballers
Serbian expatriate footballers
Expatriate footballers in Spain